Best of Both Worlds is the debut album by Davina, released on April 7, 1998 through Loud Records.

The album, which was both written and produced entirely by Davina herself, peaked at 180 on the Billboard 200 and 34 on the R&B charts, failing to gain any real commercial success. The album's two main singles managed to make it to the Billboard Hot 100. "So Good" and "Come Over to My Place" peaked at 60 and 81 on the chart respectively. Davina was dropped from Loud Records due to the album's poor sales.

Track listing
All tracks by Davina except where noted.

"Come Over to My Place" – 3:56  
"Comin' for You" – 4:16  
"So Good" (Davina, Lewis) – 4:34  
"When It Rains" – 3:55  
"Love's Comin' Down" (Davina, Kirk Wan) – 4:03  
"I Can't Help It" (Raphael Brown, Stevie Wonder) – 4:27  
"Give Me Love" – 3:56  
"Mercy" – 3:42  
"Getz No Where" – 3:46  
"Only One Reason" (Davina, Wan) – 3:55  
"The Way I Feel About You" (Kisha Chavis, Davina, Wan) – 4:12  
"After the Rain" – 6:47  
"My Cryin' Blues" – 5:05

Personnel 

Anthony Brewster – keyboards
Chris Bruce – guitar
Kisha Chavis – backing vocals
Lasuan Dandee – drums
Davina – arranger, drum programming, engineer, instrumentation, keyboards, mixing, producer, programming, vocals, backing vocals
The Detroit Symphony – orchestra
DJ Dez – DJ
Larry Ferguson – mixing Engineer
Amp Fiddler – arranger, keyboards
Bubz Fiddler – bass, bass guitar
Dave Foreman – guitar
DeAndria Foster – backing vocals
Sergio Garcia – assistant engineer
Liz Hausle – product manager
Donica Holmes – backing vocals
Milton Honore, Jr. – guitar
Tonia Johnson – backing vocals
Ola Kudu – creative director
Brian Lawrence – bass
Nick the Wiz – drum programming
Mojo Nicosia – executive producer
Prudensca Renfro – backing vocals
Paul Riser – multi instruments, string arrangements
Mark Seliger – photography
Bernard Terry– engineer, mixing, mixing engineer, second engineer
Everett Turner – multi instruments, trumpet
Tommy Verdonck – engineer, second engineer
Kirk Wan – drum programming, instrumentation
Maurice Whitaker – art direction
Ron Wright – drums

Charts

References

1998 debut albums
Loud Records albums
Relativity Records albums
Davina (R&B singer) albums